Daniel Woods (born August 1, 1989) is an American professional rock climber who specializes in bouldering and is considered one of the most important climbers in the history of bouldering. Woods has climbed over thirty bouldering problems graded  or harder, making him one of the most prolific climbers of hard boulder problems. He has also won several competitions, such as the U.S. National Bouldering Championship and some international competitions. In March 2021, Woods achieved the first ascent of a low start to Sleepwalker . He named the problem Return of the Sleepwalker and proposed the grade , making him one of only three boulderers at the time to have climbed that grade.

Early life

Woods was born in Richardson, Texas, and was introduced to climbing through the cub scouts. In 1997, when he was 8 years old, his family moved to Longmont, Colorado. Woods then began competing and was part of a junior climbing team coached by Justin Sjong and Jimmie Redo.

Climbing career

In 2003, Woods climbed his first bouldering problem rated , Fuck You Finger. The following year, at the age of 15, he made the first ascent of Echale, grading it . He won the American Bouldering Series national championship in 2005, 2006, 2007, 2009, 2010, 2012 and 2013 and the Teva Mountain Games in the bouldering category in 2006, 2007 and, 2010.

On June 19, 2007, while traveling in the Chaos Canyon area of Rocky Mountain National Park, Woods made the first ascent of Jade, formerly named The Green 45 Project, a project he had worked for several years with Dave Graham. He graded it , making it his hardest ascent at that point.  The consensus for the rating of Jade is now .

In early 2008, at the age of 18, Woods moved to Innsbruck, Austria, and spent part of his time training with Kilian Fischhuber and David Lama. In May 2008, he made the first ascent of In Search of Time Lost at Magic Wood in Switzerland and graded it .

In November 2011, Woods began filming a climbing movie called Welcome to the Hood with Paul Robinson, Guntram Jörg, and Anthony Gullsten. The filming lasted five months, during which the group climbed at some of the most famous and difficult bouldering sites in the world. The first part of the film was set in Magic Wood, Switzerland, where Woods climbed Somewhere in Between .

Competition
Despite primarily focusing on hard outdoor bouldering, Daniel Woods is one of the most accomplished American male competition climbers.  He won the ABS National Championship 9 times, the SCS National Championship, and competed in many IFSC World Cup events, earning a gold medal in the Vail World Cup in 2010.  Woods also has the most open wins at the Hueco Tanks Rock Rodeo, his most recent having been in 2017.

Notable Ascents
:
 Return of the Sleepwalker - Black Velvet Canyon (Red Rocks, USA) - 30 March 2021 - First Ascent

:
 Off the Wagon Low - Val Bavona (Switzerland) - March 2020 - Third ascent.
 Sleepwalker - Black Velvet Canyon (Red Rocks, USA) - 16 January 2019 - Second ascent
Box Therapy - Rocky Mountain National Park (USA) - 31 October 2018 - First ascent
 Creature from the Black Lagoon - Rocky Mountain National Park (USA) - 27 September 2016 - First ascent
 The Process - Bishop (USA) - 17 January 2015 - First ascent
 Hypnotized Minds - Rocky Mountain National Park (USA) - 21 October 2010 - First ascent

:
 Direct Hit - Ubatuba (BRA) - 13 December 2019 - First Ascent
 Finnish Line - Rocklands (South Africa) - 30 June 2018 - Fifth Ascent
 Topaz - Wild Basin (USA) - 12 October 2016 - Second ascent
 Spray of Light - Rocklands (South Africa) - July 2015 - First ascent
 Noise Vs Beauty - Rocklands (South Africa) - 14 June 2015 - First ascent, V14/V15
 Lucid Dreaming - Bishop (USA) - 28 January 2014 - Second ascent of Paul Robinson's boulder (2010), downgraded from 8C+(V16)
 El Diablo - Peñoles (MEX) - 19 January 2014 - First ascent
 The Nest - Red Rock (USA) - 18 December 2013 - First ascent
 Defying Gravity - South Platte (USA) - 16 November 2013 - First ascent
 The Ice Knife SDS - Guanella Pass (USA) - 2 November 2013 - First ascent
 Delirium - Mt. Evans (USA) - 18 September 2013 - Second ascent
 The Wheel of Wolvo - Mt. Evans (USA) - 9 September 2013 - Second ascent
 The Wheel of Life (original) - Grampians (AUS) - 23 July 2013 - 9th ascent of Dai Koyamada's boulder (2004), downgraded from 8C+(V16)
 Hydrangea - Shiobara (JPN) - 14 February 2013 - Second ascent of Dai Koyamada's boulder (2005), downgraded from 8C+(V16)
 Witness The Fitness - Ozark Mountains (USA) - 5 January 2013 - Third ascent
 White Noise - Wild Basin (USA) - 18 September 2012 - First ascent
 Monkey Wedding - Rocklands (South Africa) - 13 August 2012 - Fourth ascent
 Paint it Black - Rocky Mountain National Park (USA) - 29 February 2012 - First ascent
 Big Paw - Chironico (SUI) - 24 November 2011 - Second ascent
 La Force Tranquille - Magic Wood (SUI) - 15 October 2011 - First ascent
 Ill Trill - Magic Wood (SUI) - 19 April 2011 - Third ascent
 Practice of the Wild - Magic Wood (SUI) - 16 April 2011 - Third ascent
 Warrior Up - Mt. Evans (USA) - 4 September 2010 - Second ascent
 Desperanza - Hueco Tanks (USA) - 27 February 2010 - First ascent
 The Game - Boulder Canyon (USA) - 10 February 2010 - First ascent
 Terremer - Hueco Tanks (USA) - 30 January 2010 - Third ascent
 In Search of Time Lost - Magic Wood (SUI) - 9 September 2008 - First ascent

See also
 Notable first free ascents

References

External links

 

 27 Crags profile

1989 births
Living people
American rock climbers
People from Richardson, Texas
Boulder climbers